Somebody's Waiting is the fifteenth studio album by Canadian country pop artist Anne Murray, released in March 1980 via Capitol Records. The album charted lower in the U.S. than most of Murray's other releases from the same period, peaking at number 15 on the Billboard Country Albums chart and number 88 on the Billboard Pop Albums chart. In Murray's native Canada, it reached number 32.

The album's first single. "Lucky Me", reached the U.S. country Top Ten, peaking at number 9; it also reached number 42 on the U.S. pop singles charts. A second single, a cover of the Beatles' "I'm Happy Just to Dance With You", made the country Top Thirty, and reached number 64 on the Hot 100 chart.

The song, "The French Waltz", was later recorded by Art Garfunkel on his 1981 album, Scissors Cut.

Critical reception
Billboard's reviewer praised Jim Ed Norman's production by saying that it "suited exactly to her warm vocal ambiance; imaginative musical flourishes show up all through this fine package". He also noted that on this LP Murray is "back to doing what she does best: wrapping her voice around a pleasant, well-chosen variety of tunes with ballads predominant throughout."

Track listing

Personnel 
 Anne Murray – lead and backing vocals 
 Brian Gatto – keyboards 
 Pat Riccio, Jr – keyboards
 Bob Mann – guitars 
 Aidan Mason – guitars 
 Brian Russell – guitars 
 Bob Lucier – dobro, steel guitar
 Peter Cardinali – bass, horn and string arrangements 
 Jørn Anderson – drums 
 Barry Keane – drums
 Michael Brecker – tenor saxophone
 Rick Wilkins – horn and string arrangements 
 Bruce Murray – backing vocals 
 Deborah Schaal – backing vocals

Production 
 Jim Ed Norman – producer 
 Balmur Ltd. – executive producer
 Ken Friesen – engineer 
 Peter Holcomb – engineer 
 Ken Perry – mastering 
 Paul Cade – art direction, design 
 Gord Marci – photography
 Recorded at Eastern Sound (Toronto, Ontario, Canada).
 Mastered at Capitol Mastering (Hollywood, California, USA).

Chart performance

References 

1980 albums
Anne Murray albums
Capitol Records albums
Albums produced by Jim Ed Norman